Anauxesis perrieri is a species of beetle in the family Cerambycidae. It was described by Fairmaire in 1902.

References

Agapanthiini
Beetles described in 1902